Kitchen Cabinet is an Australian interview television program that is broadcast on ABC. It is hosted by Annabel Crabb. On the program, Crabb chats with the interview subjects while they prepare a meal together.

Format
The format is an informal interview program with Australian politicians over a meal prepared by both Crabb and her guest, normally in the guest's home. Crabb brings a dessert and the guest provides their choice of main meal. It is in the 30-minute format.

On several occasions, there have been two guests, typically with one being a self-confessed non-cook who brings in a helper. Crabb chats with the guest(s) during the preparation, and the meal while they eat.

Crabb's being pescotarian has meant that on some occasions the protein for her has been fish-based. Her food preference has also been a factor in her preparation of the desserts.

The show has received mostly positive reviews.

Series overview

Episodes

Season 1 (2012)
{| class="wikitable plainrowheaders" style="width:100%"
|-
!! style="background-color:#00CCFF; color: #FFF; text-align: center;" width=5%| No. inseries
!! style="background-color:#00CCFF; color: #FFF; text-align: center;" width=5%| No. inseason
!! style="background-color:#00CCFF; color: #FFF; text-align: center;" width=27%| Guest
!! style="background-color:#00CCFF; color: #FFF; text-align: center;" width=13%| Original air date

|}

Season 2 (2012)
{| class="wikitable plainrowheaders" style="width:100%"
|-
!! style="background-color:#330066; color: #FFF; text-align: center;" width=5%| No. inseries
!! style="background-color:#330066; color: #FFF; text-align: center;" width=5%| No. inseason
!! style="background-color:#330066; color: #FFF; text-align: center;" width=27%| Guest
!! style="background-color:#330066; color: #FFF; text-align: center;" width=13%| Original air date

|}

Season 3 (2013)
{| class="wikitable plainrowheaders" style="width:100%"
|-
!! style="background-color:#9300B8; color: #FFF; text-align: center;" width=5%| No. inseries
!! style="background-color:#9300B8; color: #FFF; text-align: center;" width=5%| No. inseason
!! style="background-color:#9300B8; color: #FFF; text-align: center;" width=27%| Guest
!! style="background-color:#9300B8; color: #FFF; text-align: center;" width=13%| Original air date

|}

Season 4 (2014)
{| class="wikitable plainrowheaders" style="width:100%"
|-
!! style="background-color:#FCDC3B; color: #FFF; text-align: center;" width=5%| No. inseries
!! style="background-color:#FCDC3B; color: #FFF; text-align: center;" width=5%| No. inseason
!! style="background-color:#FCDC3B; color: #FFF; text-align: center;" width=27%| Guest
!! style="background-color:#FCDC3B; color: #FFF; text-align: center;" width=13%| Original air date

|}

Season 5 (2015)
{| class="wikitable plainrowheaders" style="width:100%"
|-
!! style="background-color:#CC3333; color: #FFF; text-align: center;" width=5%| No. inseries
!! style="background-color:#CC3333; color: #FFF; text-align: center;" width=5%| No. inseason
!! style="background-color:#CC3333; color: #FFF; text-align: center;" width=27%| Guest
!! style="background-color:#CC3333; color: #FFF; text-align: center;" width=13%| Original air date

|}

Season 6 (2016)
{| class="wikitable plainrowheaders" style="width:100%"
|-
!! style="background-color:#00BB67; color: #FFF; text-align: center;" width=5%| No. inseries
!! style="background-color:#00BB67; color: #FFF; text-align: center;" width=5%| No. inseason
!! style="background-color:#00BB67; color: #FFF; text-align: center;" width=27%| Guest
!! style="background-color:#00BB67; color: #FFF; text-align: center;" width=13%| Original air date

|}

Guests
Crabb has said that her most memorable show was with Senator Nigel Scullion, when he took her collecting crustaceans in the coastal mudflats of the Northern Territory.

2013 Federal Election Kitchen Cabinet shows
During the 2013 Australian federal election, Crabb taped two shows for Kitchen Cabinet, beyond the previously normal 6 episodes, with the leaders of the major opposing parties, Tony Abbott (Liberal Party of Australia) and Kevin Rudd (Australian Labor Party) with these shows being broadcast on successive nights in the last week of the political campaign, on Wednesday 4 September and Thursday 5 September respectively.

2016 Federal Election Kitchen Cabinet shows 
During the 2016 Australian federal election, Crabb again taped two shows for Kitchen Cabinet with the leaders of the major opposing parties, Malcolm Turnbull (Liberal Party of Australia) and Bill Shorten (Australian Labor Party)

References

External links 
 
 Episodes
 

2012 Australian television series debuts
2016 Australian television series endings
ABC News and Current Affairs
Australian Broadcasting Corporation original programming
Australian non-fiction television series
English-language television shows